The Yosemite Area Regional Transportation System, also known as YARTS, is a public transit bus line based in Merced, California. YARTS provides scheduled service into popular locations within Merced, Mariposa, Mono, Tuolumne, Madera, and Fresno counties, including Yosemite National Park and Fresno Yosemite International Airport.

History
First proposed in 1992, YARTS was designed as a way to reduce traffic and increase accessibility to Yosemite National Park. In May 2000, after 8 years of planning, the bus line officially commenced service in Yosemite's neighboring communities. To date, the Yosemite Area Regional Transportation System has provided over 1,000,000 rides.

On May 23, 2015, YARTS began operating on Highway 41 between Fresno and Yosemite. The service was cut back to end in Oakhurst in 2023.

Operation
YARTS is managed by the Merced County Association of Governments, and governed by a Joint Powers Authority between Merced, Mariposa, and Mono counties. Each county provides two elected supervisors to serve on the governing board.

VIA Adventures
Although the Yosemite Area Regional Transportation System maintains a proprietary fleet of motor coaches, the majority of passengers utilizing the YARTS service are carried by VIA Adventures.

VIA Adventures, Inc. is a private charter bus company based in Merced and Tempe, Arizona. Through a contract with YARTS, VIA Adventures handles most of the passenger traffic originating from stops along the Highway 140 route. During the month of July 2011, VIA carried over 10,000 passengers.

Routes

References

External links
Yosemite Area Regional Transportation System - YARTS.com
Merced County Association of Governments

Bus transportation in California
Transportation in Merced County, California
Merced, California
Transportation in Mariposa County, California
Transportation in Mono County, California
Transit agencies in California